Match Day II is a football sports game part of the Match Day series released for the Amstrad CPC, Amstrad PCW, ZX Spectrum, MSX and Commodore 64 platforms. It was created in 1987 by Jon Ritman with graphics by Bernie Drummond and music and sound by Guy Stevens (except for the Commodore version, which was a line-by-line conversion by John Darnell). It is the sequel to 1984's Match Day.

Gameplay
The controls consist of four directions (allowing eight directions including diagonals) and a shot button. Each team has seven players, including goalkeeper and there are league and cup options available.

The game is considered highly addictive due to its difficulty level, the complete control over ball direction, power and elevation (using a Diamond Deflection System), and the importance of tactics and player positioning over the field (barging if necessary), which makes it challenging to break strong defences. Was the first game to use a kickometer.

Some versions of the game play the song When the Saints Go Marching In while the players are walking to their initial positions on the field at the beginning of each half.

The ZX Spectrum version  of the game went to number 2 in the UK sales charts, behind Out Run, and was voted the 10th best game of all time in a special issue of Your Sinclair magazine in 2004.

Related games

The game is similar to a previous unpublished game by Jon Ritman, Soccerama.  Later, in 1995, Jon Ritman tried to release Match Day III, but the name of the game was changed to Super Match Soccer to avoid any potential legal issues.

References

External links

Comment about Ritman, that allows his games to be distributed over the Internet
Match Day II playing video at youtube.com
Match Day challenge Crash - Issue 37
Martin Galway interview at c64.com
Match Day II at thelegacy.de

1987 video games
Association football video games
Video game sequels
Amstrad CPC games
Commodore 64 games
Amstrad PCW games
MSX games
Ocean Software games
ZX Spectrum games
Video games developed in the United Kingdom